Inga Abel (7 July 1946 – 27 May 2000) was a German actress. She studied ballet and figure skating from the time she was eight. From the ages of 17 to 19 she was the second soloist in the Vienna Ice Revue. After that, she took acting lessons in her hometown of Düsseldorf and performed at Die Komödie Frankfurt, the Theater am Dom in Cologne, and at the Schloßhoftheater in Moers, among others. She went on to play the role of Dr. Eva-Maria Sperling on the ARD series Lindenstraße from 1992 to 2000.

Death
Inga Abel died of breast cancer in Düsseldorf on 27 May 2000, aged 53. Hans W. Geißendörfer, the producer of Lindenstraße, on Inga Abel, the person and the actress: "She played her roles with precision, intelligence, understanding, and depth. Inga's ability, her honesty, boldness, and courage to face life will remain unforgettable."

References

External links

1946 births
2000 deaths
Actors from Düsseldorf
German television actresses
German stage actresses
Deaths from cancer in Germany
20th-century German actresses
Deaths from breast cancer